Headley Thomas Baxter (29 March 1919 — 31 August 2004) was a British tennis player and coach.

A native of Middlesex, Baxter was the British junior champion in 1935 and 1936. He won through to the singles third round of the 1947 Wimbledon Championships and took a set off third seed Tom Brown before being eliminated. During his playing career he was a member of British Davis Cup teams but was never called upon for a rubber.

Baxter was non playing Davis Cup captain for Great Britain from 1962 to 1967, then again from 1968 to 1971, both largely unsuccessful periods. He had resigned as captain in 1967 citing business commitments but was put in charge again the next year when his replacement Peter Hare had to step aside due to ill health.

References

External links
 

1919 births
2004 deaths
British male tennis players
English male tennis players
British tennis coaches
Tennis people from Greater London